Peripatopsis leonina, the Lion's Hill velvet worm, is a species of velvet worm in the Peripatopsidae family. This species has 20 to 24 pairs of legs, usually 21 or 22 leg pairs, with the last pair of legs reduced. Females of this species range from 7 mm to 41 mm in length, whereas males range from 7 mm to 34 mm.

Distribution and habitat 
The Lion's Hill velvet worm has only been recorded from the type locality; Signal Hill (also known as Lion's Hill), South Africa, where it was found under stones in small ravines. Signal Hill is situated amongst Fynbos habitat.

Conservation 

Peripatopsis leonina was previously considered extinct but is currently listed as Critically Endangered on the IUCN Red List, on conservative grounds that some undiscovered individuals may still persist. Habitat loss and degradation are thought to be the reasons for the species' decline.

References 

Animals described in 1899
Endemic fauna of South Africa
IUCN-assessed onychophorans
Onychophorans of temperate Africa
Onychophoran species